16 Lyrae is a suspected astrometric binary star system in the constellation Lyra, located 126 light years away from the Sun based on parallax. It is visible to the naked eye as a dim, white-hued star with a combined apparent visual magnitude of 5.00. The system is moving further away from the Earth with a heliocentric radial velocity of +5 km/s. It is a suspected member of the Ursa Major Moving Group stream.

Cowley et al. (1969) found a stellar classification of A7 V for the visible component, matching an A-type main-sequence star that is generating energy through hydrogen fusion at its core. Abt and Morrell (1995) instead listed a class of A6 IV, suggesting it has left the main sequence and become a subgiant star. It is 791 million years old with a high rate of spin, showing a projected rotational velocity of 124 km/s.

References 

A-type main-sequence stars
A-type subgiants
Astrometric binaries
Lyra (constellation)
Durchmusterung objects
Lyrae, 16
177196
093408
7215
Suspected variables